Anastasia Nikolaevna Sletova-Chernova (1879–1938) was a Russian educator and politician. In 1917 she was one of the ten women elected to the Constituent Assembly, the country's first female parliamentarians.

Biography
Sletova-Chernova was born in Tambov in 1873. She was educated at a local gymnasium, after which she worked as a teacher. She studied extracurricular education abroad and became head of a Sunday school and the Society for the Organisation of Public Readings. In 1898 she married Viktor Chernov; the couple emigrated the following year, and in 1901 were founders of the Socialist Revolutionary Party.

Living in Kozlov at the time of the Russian Revolution, in 1917 she and Victor were Socialist-Revolutionary candidates in Tambov in the Constituent Assembly elections, and she one of ten women elected to the legislature. After the Bolsheviks forced the Constituent Assembly to be dissolved, she was subsequently arrested on several occasions and imprisoned in 1921. In 1938 she was included in Stalin's shooting lists, but died in prison before her case could be heard.

References

1879 births
People from Tambov
Russian educators
Russian revolutionaries
Russian Constituent Assembly members
20th-century Russian women politicians
Socialist Revolutionary Party politicians
Soviet people who died in prison custody
1938 deaths
Female revolutionaries
Educators from the Russian Empire